Cacia is a genus of longhorn beetles of the subfamily Lamiinae.

Description 
Cacia species typically are black with some kind of pale yellow patterns over the body and legs, usually thick spots or detailed speckles. Like other species in the subfamily Lamiinae, they have fairly pale markings, and their colors are not as bright yellow as some species within the family Cerambycidae, or longhorns. Cacia beetle antennae are slightly longer than the length of their bodies, compared to some Lamiinae with incredibly long antennae.

Species 
Cacia containing the following species:

subgenus Acanthocacia
 Cacia bispinosa Aurivillius, 1911
 Cacia collarti Breuning, 1960
 Cacia compta Pascoe, 1865
 Cacia flavoguttata Breuning, 1968
 Cacia flavovariegata Breuning, 1974
 Cacia guttata (Aurivillius, 1927)
 Cacia melanopsis Pascoe, 1866
 Cacia multiguttata Breuning, 1968
 Cacia picticornis Pascoe, 1858
 Cacia salomonum Aurivillius, 1921
 Cacia singaporensis Breuning, 1974

subgenus Cacia
 Cacia anancyloides Breuning, 1958
 Cacia bioculata Heller, 1923
 Cacia celebensis Breuning, 1938
 Cacia confusa Pascoe, 1857
 Cacia curta Breuning, 1935
 Cacia estrellae Hüdepohl, 1989
 Cacia evittata Breuning, 1924
 Cacia flavobasalis Breuning, 1938
 Cacia flavomaculipennis Breuning, 1974
 Cacia fruhstorferi Breuning, 1969
 Cacia griseovittata Breuning, 1974
 Cacia grossepunctata Breuning, 1980
 Cacia hebridarum Breuning, 1970
 Cacia herbacea Pascoe, 1866
 Cacia inculta Pascoe, 1857
 Cacia intermedia Heller, 1923
 Cacia intricata Pascoe, 1865
 Cacia kaszabi Breuning, 1954
 Cacia kinabaluensis Breuning, 1982
 Cacia niasica Breuning, 1974
 Cacia palawanica Breuning, 1936
 Cacia parintricata Breuning, 1982
 Cacia proteus Heller, 1915
 Cacia sarawakensis Breuning, 1938
 Cacia spinigera Newman, 1842
 Cacia strellae Hüdepohl, 1989
 Cacia triangularis Breuning, 1980
 Cacia trimaculata Breuning, 1947

subgenus Coreothrophora 
 Cacia aequifasciata Heller, 1924
 Cacia albicollis Heller, 1923
 Cacia albofasciata Breuning, 1980
 Cacia aspersa Newman, 1842
 Cacia elegans Breuning, 1939
 Cacia imitatrix Heller, 1923
 Cacia interruptovittata Heller, 1923
 Cacia latefasciata Breuning, 1947
 Cacia ligata Schwarzer, 1924
 Cacia lumawigi Hüdepohl, 1989
 Cacia marionae Hüdepohl, 1989
 Cacia milagrosae Hüdepohl, 1989
 Cacia nigricollis Heller, 1923
 Cacia nigroabdominalis Heller, 1923
 Cacia ochraceomaculata Breuning, 1936
 Cacia parelegans Breuning, 1982
 Cacia parumpunctata Heller, 1923
 Cacia semiluctuosa Blanchard, 1853
 Cacia sexplagiata Heller, 1924
 Cacia shirupiti Kano, 1939
 Cacia vanikorensis (Boisduval, 1835)

subgenus Ipocregyes
 Cacia albocancellata Breuning, 1974
 Cacia albovariegata Breuning, 1935
 Cacia andamanica Breuning, 1935 
 Cacia arisana (Kano, 1933)
 Cacia assamensis Breuning, 1948
 Cacia basialboantennalis Breuning, 1958
 Cacia basifasciata Breuning, 1939
 Cacia batoensis Breuning, 1956
 Cacia beccarii Gahan, 1907
 Cacia binaluanica Breuning, 1966
 Cacia bituberosa Breuning, 1935
 Cacia bootanana Breuning, 1968 
 Cacia brunnea Breuning, 1939
 Cacia butuana Heller, 1923
 Cacia cephaloides Breuning, 1968
 Cacia cephalotes (Pic, 1925)
 Cacia colambugana Heller, 1923
 Cacia flavipennis Breuning, 1947
 Cacia flavomarmorata Breuning, 1939
 Cacia formosana (Schwarzer, 1925)
 Cacia grisescens Breuning, 1935
 Cacia hieroglyphica Heller, 1923
 Cacia imogenae Hüdepohl, 1989
 Cacia integricornis Schwarzer, 1930
 Cacia lacrimosa Heller, 1923
 Cacia lepesmei Gressitt, 1951
 Cacia malaccensis Breuning, 1935
 Cacia monstrabilis Heller, 1915
 Cacia newmanni Pascoe, 1857
 Cacia nigrofasciata Gressitt, 1940
 Cacia nigrohumeralis Breuning, 1939
 Cacia obliquelineata Breuning, 1950
 Cacia obsessa Pascoe, 1866
 Cacia ochreosignata Breuning, 1938
 Cacia perahensis Breuning, 1968
 Cacia postmediofasciata Breuning, 1947
 Cacia rosacea Heller, 1923
 Cacia scenica Pascoe, 1865
 Cacia semilactea Heller, 1923
 Cacia setulosa Pascoe, 1857
 Cacia sibuyana Heller, 1923
 Cacia spilota Gahan, 1907
 Cacia subcephalotes Breuning, 1968
 Cacia subfasciata Schwarzer, 1930
 Cacia suturefasciata Breuning, 1947
 Cacia suturevitta Breuning, 1963
 Cacia transversefasciata Breuning, 1947
 Cacia triangulifera Heller, 1900
 Cacia ulula Heller, 1915
 Cacia unda Heller, 1923
 Cacia vermiculata Heller, 1923
 Cacia watantakkuni (Kano, 1933)
 Cacia xenoceroides Heller, 1915
 Cacia yunnana Breuning, 1938

subgenus Pericacia
 Cacia cretifera (Hope, 1831)
 Cacia fasciolata (Boisduval, 1835)

subgenus Pseudocacia
 Cacia tonkinensis Pic, 1926

subgenus Spinocacia
 Cacia coomani Breuning, 1958
 Cacia olivacea Breuning, 1935

References

 
Mesosini
Cerambycidae genera